The 2020 All-Ireland Under-20 Hurling Championship was the second staging of the All-Ireland Under-20 Championship and the 57th staging overall of a hurling championship for players between the minor and senior grades. The championship was scheduled to begin in May 2020, however, it was postponed indefinitely due to the impact of the COVID-19 pandemic on Gaelic games. The championship eventually began on 19 October 2020 and, after being suspended once again, ended on 10 July 2021.

Tipperary entered the championship as the defending champions in search of a third successive title, however, they were beaten by Cork in the Munster final. Kerry fielded a team in the Munster Championship for the first time since 2005.

On 10 July 2021, Cork won the championship following a 2-19 to 1-18 defeat of Dublin in the All-Ireland final at UPMC Nowlan Park. This was a record 12th All-Ireland title overall and their first title since 1998.

Dublin's Liam Murphy was the championship's top scorer with 0-37.

Format change

The championship was scheduled to begin in May 2020, however, it was postponed indefinitely due to the coronavirus pandemic in Ireland. When the championship resumed, time constraints led to a revision of the format, with the All-Ireland semi-finals being abolished, thus resulting in no second chance for the defeated Leinster and Munster finalists.

Team summaries

Results

Leinster Under-20 Hurling Championship

Round 1

Quarter-finals

Semi-finals

Final

Munster Under-20 Hurling Championship

Quarter-finals

Semi-finals

Final

All-Ireland Under-20 Hurling Championship

Final

Championship statistics

Top scorers

Top scorers overall

Top scorers in a single game

Miscellaneous

 In winning the  Leinster final, Dublin defeated Galway for the first time in the history of the championship.

References

Under-20
All-Ireland Under-20 Hurling Championship
All-Ireland Championship